Double Butte is the  mountain summit, distinguished by two buttes, (the other at about ) in Riverside County, California.

History
To the east of the Double Butte, there is a disposal site landfill around the area, but it has been closed in recent years.

Geography
The Double Butte County Regional Park is located in the canyon in the middle of the south side of the range. By 2014, the County Regional Park was still undeveloped and closed to the public.

It is the westernmost summit of a mountain range north of Winchester, California, east of Perris Valley and west of the San Jacinto Valley.  The eastern ridge is composed primarily of metamorphic rock of the Triassic - Jurassic French Valley formation.  The remainder of the Double Butte range is composed primarily of Cretaceous granitic rock.

Hiking

Two hiking trails exist on the mountain, one to the peak and the other along its west face.

Two climbing sites are located on its west face.

References 

Mountains of Riverside County, California
Peninsular Ranges
Climbing areas of California
Mountains of Southern California
Buttes of California